Yulparirra or Yulparija (Yulparitja) is one of the Wati languages of the large Pama–Nyungan family of Australia. It is sometimes counted as a dialect of the Western Desert Language, but is classified as a distinct language in Bowern.

It is one of the components of the Martu Wangka koine.

Phonology
Yulparija has a typical phonemic inventory for languages of the Kimberley area. It uses 17 consonants in five distinct places of articulation.

Vowels
Yulparija uses a three vowel system, with a length contrast for the open vowel  and the close back vowel .

References

Wati languages
Endangered indigenous Australian languages in Western Australia